Interdisciplinary Description of Complex Systems (INDECS) is a peer-reviewed scientific journal on complex systems, published in Zagreb, Croatia.  It is published by a non-governmental organization, the society znanost.org.

See also 
 Croatian Interdisciplinary Society

External links 
 INDECS website
 znanost.org website

Systems journals
Science and technology in Croatia